The Manila Major, also known as the Spring Major, was a professional Dota 2 esport tournament that took place in Manila, Philippines. The main event was held at the Mall of Asia Arena from June 7–12, 2016.

Participating teams
Direct invitation
 Evil Geniuses
 OG
 Team Secret
 Team Liquid
 Alliance
 Natus Vincere
 Araburat Gaming
 LGD Gaming
 Vici Gaming
 Fnatic
 MVP Phoenix
 compLexity Gaming

Regional qualifiers
 Digital Chaos (Americas)
 Newbee (China)
 Team Empire (Europe)
 Mineski (Southeast  Asia)

Results

Group stage

Main Event

Winnings 
(Note: Prizes are in USD)

References

External links
 

2016 in esports
2016 in Philippine sport
Sports in Manila
Dota 2 Majors
June 2016 sports events in Asia
Professional Gamers League competitions